Alia Salman Khader Abu El Hawa (born 11 January 1997) is an American-born Jordanian footballer who plays as a midfielder. She has been a member of the Jordan women's national team.

References 

1997 births
Living people
Jordanian women's footballers
Jordan women's international footballers
Women's association football midfielders
Women's association football defenders
American women's soccer players
Soccer players from Virginia
Sportspeople from Fairfax County, Virginia
People from Vienna, Virginia
American people of Jordanian descent
Virginia Tech Hokies women's soccer players
21st-century American women